Ármann Smári Björnsson (born 7 January 1981 in Höfn) is an Icelandic former footballer who last played for Íþróttabandalag Akraness.

Club career
Born in Höfn, southeast Iceland, he started his club career at local outfit UMF Sindri in 1996, when he was 15 years old. In 1998, he was top scorer in the D-division with 32 goals.  In 2001, he joined Valur and in 2002 he was loaned to SK Brann, and showed himself to be the club's most effective striker. But over-prizing from his club Valur, and the hiring of a new manager in Brann, spoiled a permanent transfer to Norway for Ármann. He returned to Iceland, where he won the Icelandic Premier League in three consecutive years with FH Hafnarfjarðar.

On 21 August 2006, SK Brann confirmed that Ármann was ready for his 2nd spell in the Norwegian club. He signed a 3-year contract with the Norwegian club after they agreed to pay an undisclosed fee to FH for his services. He was one match short of receiving the Premiership-silver medal.

In 2007, he won the Norwegian league with SK Brann, and scored 9 times in 26 league, cup and UEFA cup matches.

In August 2009 he was sold to Hartlepool United and made his debut coming on as sub in the 1–1 home draw against Wycombe Wanderers. He is infamously remembered by Hartlepool fans for when he missed from less than 2 yards in a 1–0 win over Huddersfield Town.

In May 2011 he was not offered a new contract by the club, along with nine other players from the 2010/11 squad.

He joined ÍA in 2012. After suffering a season-ending injury in 2016 he announced his retirement on 10 March 2017.

International career
After a string of impressive displays in the 2006 season, Ármann earned his first international cap for Iceland when he came on as a substitute against Spain in a friendly in Reykjavík on 15 August 2006. His second cap was also against Spain as a substitute, this time in the qualifying for the Euro 2008 on 8 September 2007. In the third game he started against Northern Ireland and scored after six minutes, Iceland won 2–1.

Honours

Iceland

Icelandic Premier League: 2004, 2005 and 2006
Icelandic League Cup: 2004, 2006

Norway 

Norwegian Premier League: 2007

References

External links
Armann Bjornsson profile at Vital Hartlepool

1981 births
Living people
Armann Smari Bjornsson
Armann Smari Bjornsson
Armann Smari Bjornsson
Armann Smari Bjornsson
Armann Smari Bjornsson
Armann Smari Bjornsson
SK Brann players
Hartlepool United F.C. players
Armann Smari Bjornsson
Expatriate footballers in Norway
Expatriate footballers in England
Armann Smari Bjornsson
Eliteserien players
Armann Smari Bjornsson
Armann Smari Bjornsson
Association football defenders
Association football forwards
English Football League players